Emmeline Freda Du Faur (16 September 188213 September 1935) was an Australian mountaineer, credited as the first woman to climb New Zealand's tallest mountain, Aoraki / Mount Cook. Du Faur was a leading amateur climber of her day. She was the first female high mountaineer known to be active in New Zealand, although she never lived there.

"Freda Du Faur extended the limits of the possible, not just for women, but for all guided climbers of the period. Key factors were her rock-climbing ability, determination, and physical fitness".

Early life
Du Faur was born in Croydon, Sydney, on 16 September 1882. She was the daughter of Frederick Eccleston Du Faur (1832–1915), a public servant who, after retirement, became a stock, station, and land agent, and patron of the arts, and his second wife, Blanche Mary Elizabeth Woolley (1845–1906). Her grandfather was Professor John Woolley.

She was educated at Sydney Church of England Girls Grammar School. She probably developed her passion for mountaineering when she lived with her family near the Ku-ring-gai Chase National Park. As a young woman, she explored the area and taught herself to rock climb. She did not finish nursing training due to her "sensitive and highly-strung nature". Due to the interests of her parents, and an inheritance from an aunt, Emmeline Woolley, she had an independent income that enabled her to travel and climb.

Encountering Mount Cook (1906)
Du Faur summered in New Zealand. In late 1906, she saw photographs of Mount Cook at the New Zealand International Exhibition in Christchurch. This prompted her to travel to the Hermitage hotel at Mount Cook, where she became determined to climb to the snow-capped summit.

Mountaineering experiences (1906–1910)
In 1908, a second trip to Mount Cook led to Du Faur's introduction to a New Zealand guide, Peter Graham. Graham agreed to teach Du Faur ropework and add snow and ice climbing to her skill on rocks. Du Faur found this freedom an enjoyable escape from the constraints and frustrations of family and society.

In 1909, Du Faur returned to undertake several climbs of increasing difficulty, the first of which was a significant ascent of Mount Sealy on 19 December 1909. Though these climbs were intended to be just Graham and Du Faur, social norms of propriety at the time did not look kindly on an overnight climbing expedition composed solely of an unmarried woman and a male guide. Thus, a chaperone was enlisted, and Du Faur committed to wearing a skirt to just below the knee over knickerbockers and long puttees while she climbed. Still, she received criticism from both males and females for her choices in athleticism and dress. After her climb to the summit of Mount Cook in 1910, she's quoted as stating: "I was the first unmarried woman to climb in New Zealand, and in consequence, I received all the hard knocks until one day when I awoke more or less famous in the mountaineering world, after which I could and did do exactly as seemed to me best." Following her notoriety, she would dispense with a chaperone but retain her customary climbing attire. It pleased her that her attire afforded an element of femininity to upset critics and challenge existing stereotypes of physically active women.

In 1910, Du Faur spent three months at the Dupain Institute of Physical Education in Sydney training with Muriel "Minnie" Cadogan (1885–1929), who became her life partner. After the training, Du Faur returned to Mount Cook in November 1910.

Summiting Mount Cook (December 1910)
Her guides included Peter and Alex (Alec) Graham, and together they ascended in a record six hours.

Du Faur stated about her ascent to the summit: 'I gained the summit ... feeling very little, very lonely and much inclined to cry'.

On the return trip from the summit, Du Faur was photographed in front of a boulder to commemorate the historic climb. The boulder, now called "Freda's Rock" is located approximately 200 meters into the Hooker Valley Track at Mount Cook National Park.

Subsequent climbing seasons
Du Faur made many other noteworthy climbs. In the same season as her Mount Cook ascent in 1910, she climbed Mounts De la Beche and Green, and was the first person to climb Chudleigh.

In the next climbing season, she scaled a virgin peak now named Mount Du Faur after her. She also made the first ascents of Mount Nazomi and Mount Dampier, and the second ascents of Mount Tasman and Mount Lendenfeld.

In her final season, she made the first ascents of Mount Pibrac and Mount Cadogan, both of which she named. Perhaps her most notable climb was in January 1913 with Peter Graham and David (Darby) Thomson, when they made the first grand traverse of all three peaks of Mount Cook. This 'grand traverse' is now regarded as a classic climb of New Zealand's Southern Alps and continues to be associated with Du Faur's name.

On 10 February 1913, the same climbing party made the first traverse of Mount Sefton. Du Faur stopped climbing the next month.

Life after mountaineering (1914–1935)
Du Faur and her partner, Muriel Cadogan, moved to England in 1914, spending time in Bournemouth. Though they had intended to climb the European Alps, Canada, and the Himalayas, World War I prevented their plans. The following year, Du Faur published her book The Conquest of Mount Cook in London. It proved important for its record of her mountaineering feats and her approach to climbing.

In June 1929, Cadogan committed suicide after her family forcibly separated her from Du Faur. Du Faur returned to Australia, where she lived in Dee Why, Sydney. At first, she lived with her brother's family and later in her own cottage. Her main interest was bushwalking in Dee Why and Collaroy. She suffered from depression at the loss of Cadogan, and on 13 September 1935, she fatally poisoned herself with carbon monoxide.

Du Faur was privately interred in the Church of England cemetery at Manly, Sydney.

Acknowledgements
At a ceremony on 3 December 2006, Du Faur's previously unmarked grave was marked by a group of New Zealanders. A memorial stone made of New Zealand greywacke and a plaque commemorating her alpine achievements were placed at the gravesite.

In 2017 there was a theatre play about Du Faur written by Jan Bolwell and premiered at BATS Theatre in New Zealand. The play is called Taking the High Ground, and also features New Zealand climber Lydia Bradey.

References

Bibliography
 Freda Du Faur: The Conquest of Mount Cook and Other Climbs: An Account of Four Seasons Mountaineering on the Southern Alps of New Zealand. London: Allen and Unwin (1915), republ. New Zealand: Capper Press (1977) at New Zealand Electronic Text Collection
 Freda Du Faur: The Conquest of Mount Cook and Other Climbs at Internet Archive
 Sally Irwin: Between Heaven and Earth: The Life of Mountaineer Freda du Faur: 1882–1935. Hawthorn, Victoria: White Crane Press: 2000: 
 E. J. O'Donnell: Du Faur, Emmeline Freda (1882–1935), Australian Dictionary of Biography, Volume 8 (1981). Melbourne University Press pp 349–350.
 Bee Dawson: Lady Travellers: Tourists of Early New Zealand (2001). Auckland: Penguin 
 Jim Wilson: Aōrangi: The Story of Mount Cook (1968). Christchurch: Whitcombe and Tombes

External links

 Map of gravesite at Google Maps
 Finding Freda Du Faur at SummitPost.org.
 Freda Du Faur at Australian Dictionary of Biography
 Women on the Summit of Mt. Cook, N.Z. at RootsWeb
 Starlit Heights and Winding Valleys: The life of Freda Du Faur (2009) at Radio National

1882 births
1935 suicides
Australian mountain climbers
Lesbian sportswomen
New Zealand feminists
New Zealand mountain climbers
Suicides by carbon monoxide poisoning
Suicides in New South Wales
New Zealand LGBT sportspeople
Female climbers
New Zealand Anglicans
LGBT Anglicans
LGBT climbers
19th-century Australian women
20th-century Australian women
20th-century New Zealand women
Australian LGBT sportspeople
Australian people of New Zealand descent